Still 17 is a South Korean television series starring Shin Hye-sun, Yang Se-jong and Ahn Hyo-seop. It aired on SBS's Mondays and Tuesdays at 22:00 (KST) time slot from July 23 to September 18, 2018 for 32 episodes.

Plot
Gong Woo-jin (Yang Se-jong) is a 30-year-old single man who works as a set designer. Due to trauma he experienced 13 years ago, he does not want to have a relationship with others. When Woo Seo-ri (Shin Hye-sun) was 17, she fell into a coma. Thirteen years later, she wakes up from her coma, but she is now 30-years-old. Gong Woo-jin and Woo Seo-ri get involved with each other and fall in love.

Gong Woo-jin caused an accident when he was 17 years old, or so he believes. Due to the crush he had on a girl of his age, he caused her to stay on the bus she was travelling for one stop longer than required. As a result, she was still on the bus when it crashed, and later Gong Woo-jin finds out that this girl (No Soo-mi) died in the accident. He feels very guilty and goes away to study in Germany and carries this guilt with him into adulthood. As a result, he becomes a very strange adult. His habits include getting out a tape to make measurements for his set design miniatures at any given moment. He often gets into trouble for this habit, and he's also cold and rude to others. He even leaves Korea for long periods of time to go on trips without a word to anyone.

Woo Seo-ri wakes up in hospital confused to find that she has aged 13 years overnight. She last remembers being 17 years old, wearing her friend No Soo-mi's jacket since she forgot to pick up her own. She was in a coma and woke up after 13 years to find herself much older and very weak. Sadly, she has no visitors, and the staff can't even find out where her relatives (her Aunt and Uncle; her parents died when she was young) are. Seo-ri finds this out after overhearing the nurse who keeps fobbing her off with excuses talking about how they say this to patients whose relatives don't come by anymore.

She decides to take matters into her own hands and search for her Aunt and Uncle. She goes to the last place she remembers them - their home - but the city is hugely changed from how she remembers. By a twist of fate, her Aunt and Uncle no longer live there: they sold the house to Woo-jin's father, who is now letting his adult son stay there while he's back in Korea. Woo-jin is also looking after his nephew, Yoo Chan (Ahn Hyo-seop), an energetic and friendly guy who instantly wants to take care of Seo-ri, despite Woo-jin's misgivings. Neither of them recognizes one another at first, but Woo-jin agrees to let her stay for just one night so that she can begin the search for her relatives.

Meanwhile, at the hospital, a doctor is dismayed to hear that Seo-ri has gone missing and begins to search for her. The next day, he asks about her at her old home - but a misunderstanding doesn't let them meet.

The plot follows Seo-ri's search for her relatives; the budding romances between Seo-ri and Woo-jin, but also Yoo Chan and the doctor, who both develop ill-fated feelings for her; Woo-jin's transformation from a surly and closed-off set designer to someone who dares to love again; Yoo Chan's rowing championships; and their strange housekeeper Jennifer (Ye Ji-won), who ends up being tied up in the accident thanks to her past as well.

Cast

Main
 Shin Hye-sun as Woo Seo-ri
 Park Si-eun as young Woo Seo-ri 
 An aspiring violinist whose dreams were destroyed due to an accident. She got into a bus accident when she was 17 years old and woke up from a coma after 13 years. She still feels she is 17 even though she is now 30 years old. She has been looking for her uncle and aunt who did not come to visit her and even sold their house where Seo-ri lived with them. She later develops feelings for Woo-jin unaware of their past.
 Yang Se-jong as Gong Woo-jin
 Yoon Chan-young as young Gong Woo-jin
A stage designer who maintains a detached and aloof behavior. He goes to great lengths to keep himself from getting involved with those around him such as by wearing earphones, blocking the clients from contacting him and by putting on an obtuse personality and generally just ignoring social cues. Because of his occupation, he has developed a habit of measuring random items in public with a measuring tape. 
 When he was younger, he had a crush on a girl who he learned was named No Soo-mi because of the uniform name tag not knowing that it was borrowed. On the day of their first interaction, she was involved in an accident which resulted in several deaths. Woo-jin blames himself for what happened to her and so he decided not to become involved with others in any way in the future. He later develops feelings for Seo-ri unaware of who in the past she actually was for him.
 Ahn Hyo-seop as Yoo Chan
 Woo-jin's nephew and protector. Captain of the rowing club of Taesan High School. He falls for Seo-ri. 
 Ye Ji-won as Jennifer
A well-versed lady, skilled in martial arts and always focused on the work she does, she has modern charming looks although she wears the same attire and is in her 40's. She has a strange personality. She is also the housekeeper of the house where Gong Woo-jin and his nephew reside. She harbors a secret that indirectly ties her with the accident 13 years ago.

Supporting

People around Gong Woo-jin

 Jung Yoo-jin as Kang Hee-soo
A talented stage designer. Woo-jin's colleague. 
 Ahn Seung-gyun as Jin Hyun  
 Lee Ah-hyun as Gong Hyun-jung
 Woo-jin's sister and Yoo Chan's mother. A surgeon.

People around Woo Seo-ri
 Wang Ji-won as Kim Tae-rin
A talented violinist and music director. Seo-ri's biggest competitor.
 Yoon Sun-woo as Kim Hyung-tae
Wang Seok-hyeon as young Hyung-tae
A neurology resident. Seo-ri's childhood friend who has had a crush on her and is the only one who knows her relatives' whereabouts.
Lee Seo-yeon as No Soo-mi 
Seo-ri's best friend. She died in the accident. She lent her school uniform to Seo-ri causing Woo-jin to mistake Seo-ri's name for her best friend's name.

Woo Seo-ri's family
Jeon Ye-seo as Kim Hyun-jin
Seo-ri's mother.
Jeon Bae-soo as Woo Sung-hyun
Seo-ri's father.
Lee Seung-joon as Kim Hyun-gyu
Seo-ri's uncle.
Shim Yi-young as Kook Mi-hyun
Seo-ri's aunt.

Taesan High School
 Lee Do-hyun as Dong Hae-bum
Yoo Chan's best friend.
Jo Hyun-sik as Han Deok-soo
Yoo Chan's best friend.
Jo Yoo-jung as Lee Ri-an
Yoo Chan's friend who has a crush on him.

People around Jennifer
Kim Young-jae as Kim Tae-jin (Ep. 28-29)
Jennifer's husband

Others
Jung Ho-bin as Byun Gyu-chul
Kim Min-sang as Woo-jin's physician
Kim Ji-yee
Son San
Seo Yun-ah
Ha Do-kwon as Rowing Club Coach
Ji Dae-han
Park Jong-hoon
Min Eun-kyung

Special appearances
Jeong Jin-woon as Jung Jin-woon
Yoo Chan's rival in rowing competition (Ep. 24-25)

Production
The first script reading took place May 16, 2018, at SBS Studio in Tanhyun, Ilsan, South Korea.

Original soundtrack

Part 1

Part 2

Part 3

Part 4

Part 5

Part 6

Part 7

Viewership

Awards and nominations

Notes

References

External links
  

 

Seoul Broadcasting System television dramas
Korean-language television shows
2018 South Korean television series debuts
2018 South Korean television series endings
South Korean romantic comedy television series
Television series by Bon Factory Worldwide